Solenostomus paegnius, the roughsnout ghost pipefish is a species of ghost pipefish from the family Solenostomidae. It is an Indo-Pacific species which occurs from the Red Sea east to Japan and Australia. It occurs over algal/rubble reefs and sandy sea beds, often below depths of  They are largely pelagic until they settle on the substrate to breed.

References

Fish described in 1914

Fish of the Indian Ocean
Taxa named by David Starr Jordan
Taxa named by William Francis Thompson